Harmony Hill is an unincorporated area 15 miles northeast of Henderson and 3 miles southwest of Tatum in northeastern Rusk County, Texas.

History
The land was donated by John W. Kuykendall a prosperous plantation owner in the 1840s. The nickname of the town was Nip 'n' Tuck until it was officially named Harmony Hill in 1856. A post office was established in 1854, William P. Johnston was the postmaster, the post office was closed in 1867. The post office was reopened 1868 and closed in 1905, when mail began being sent to Tatum. A baptist church was the first church opened in the community. By 1860 the town had grown to 8-10 stores, a druggist, blacksmith, furniture factory, race track, Masonic lodge, doctor, and school. Due to bypass by the railroad the town began to decline in the 1870s and 1880s. In 1906 many of the structures were destroyed by a tornado. Only a few homes and a cemetery remained in 1950. A 1984 county highway map showed a church and business in Harmony Hill. A historical marker now sits in the Harmony Hill Cemetery.
The Harmony Hill Cemetery Association annually honors 20-25 buried confederate soldiers.

References

Ghost towns in East Texas